Missouri River Bridge may refer to:

Liberty Memorial Bridge, between Bismarck and Mandan, North Dakota, also known as Missouri River Bridge
Bob Kerrey Pedestrian Bridge, also known as Missouri River Pedestrian Bridge
Washington Bridge (Washington, Missouri), also known as Route 47 Missouri River Bridge
Illinois Central Missouri River Bridge
Union Pacific Missouri River Bridge
Burt County Missouri River Bridge
Missouri River Bridge, listed on the National Register of Historic Places listings in Lewis and Clark County, Montana

See also
List of crossings of the Missouri River